Rubina may refer to:

Antidesma, a tropical plant genus of about 170 species from the family Phyllanthaceae
 Rubina (composition), by Joe Satriani
 Rubina (actress) (born 1984), Indian actress
 Rubina Bajwa (born 1986), Indian actress
 Rubina Berardo (born 1982), Portuguese politician and Member of the Assembly of the Republic
 Rubina Ali (born 1999), Indian child actress who played the younger version of Latika in Slumdog Millionaire (2008)
 Rubina Ashraf, Pakistani TV actress
 Rubina Marivonne Haroon, Regional Representative for Eastern and Southern Africa for WWF International
 Rubina Kuraoka (born 1987), German voice actor
 Rubina Rana (1956–2003), Pakistani Norwegian politician for the Labour Party
 Rubina Dilaik (born 1987), Indian actress
 Dina Rubina (born 1953), Russian-Israeli prose writer
 "Rubina", a song by Joe Satriani on the album Not of This Earth